Halland Battalion, designated № 28, was an infantry unit of the Swedish Army that was active in various forms from 1813 to 1901. The unit was based in Halmstad Garrison in Halmstad.

History
Halland Battalion was raised on 14 May 1813, under the name of Hallands läns första infanteribataljon ("Halland County First Infantry Battalion"). From 1813 to 1835, the battalion was partly subordinated to Älvsborg Regiment. On 30 October 1818, the battalion adopted the name of Halland Infantry Battalion. In 1835, the battalion was separated from Älvsborg Regiment, and formed an independent unit. On 1 January 1887, the name Halland Battalion was adopted. On 31 December 1901, the battalion was disbanded as an independent unit, and from 1 January 1902 it was amalgamated with Värmland Rifle Corps (Värmlands fältjägarkår) and formed Vaxholm Grenadier Regiment.

Barracks and training areas
When the battalion was raised in 1813, it was placed to Öster mosse (literally "Eastern bog") outside Halmstad. In 1816, the battalion was placed on the Påskberget ("Easter Mountain") in Varberg. On 22 June 1833, the battalion was placed to Galgberget in Halmstad, and on 15 April 1844 it was relocated back to Öster mosse. Between 1857 and 1901, the battalion was located in Skedalahed, about 5 km east of Halmstad. However, the regimental staff was located in Halmstad.

Heraldry and traditions

On 24 April 1862, the battalion was presented with a colour at a ceremony at Skedalahed. After the battalion was disbanded, Vaxholm Grenadier Regiment came to carry the colour alongside the colour of the Värmland Rifle Corps. In 1959, Halland Regiment erected a memorial stone over the battalion's time at Skedalahed. In connection with the Swedish Armed Forces leaving Skedalahed in 2000, the stone was moved to a new location.

Commanding officers
1813–1873: ?
1873–1881: Helmer Falk
1881–1901: ?

Names, designations and locations

Footnotes

References

Notes

Print

Further reading

Infantry battalions of the Swedish Army
Disbanded units and formations of Sweden
Military units and formations established in 1813
Military units and formations disestablished in 1901